The Pasărea is a left tributary of the river Danube in Romania. It discharges into the Danube in Zimnicea.

References

Rivers of Teleorman County
Rivers of Romania